The Rio Madeira stipplethroat (Epinecrophylla amazonica), also called Madeira stipple-throated antwren,  Madeira antwren or Rio Madeira antwren, is a species of bird in the family Thamnophilidae found in Brazil and Bolivia. Until 2014, it was considered a subspecies of the rufous-backed stipplethroat. The Rio Madeira stipplethroat has two subspecies:
 Epinecrophylla amazonica amazonica (von Ihering, 1905) - Brazil and Bolivia
 Epinecrophylla amazonica dentei Whitney, BM et al., 2013 - Brazil

References

Rio Madeira stipplethroat
Birds of the Brazilian Amazon
Birds of the Bolivian Amazon
Taxa named by Hermann von Ihering 
Rio Madeira stipplethroat